The Seagull is an opera in three acts by Thomas Pasatieri to an English libretto by Kenward Elmslie. The plot is based on Anton Chekhov's 1896 play, The Seagull.

Performance history
The work had its world premiere at Houston Grand Opera on 5 March 1974 conducted by Charles Rosekrans. Notable later productions include Seattle Opera (1976), Washington National Opera (1978), Atlanta Civic Opera (1980), Fort Worth Opera (1982) and the Manhattan School of Music (2002). On 23 April 2004, a revised version premiered on at the San Francisco Opera Center, a resident artist program of San Francisco Opera. In September 2010 The Seagull was performed at Dicapo Opera in New York City as part of the international Armel Opera Competition and Festival. A European premiere will follow in November from the National Theatre of Szeged in Hungary; this production will be televised live to more than 40 countries and streamed live across the web.

Roles

Recording
The first, and only, complete commercial recording of the opera is based on the live performance of the work's New York City premiere at the Manhattan School of Music.
Thomas Pasatieri: The Seagull – Keri Behan (Masha), Isai Jess Munoz (Medvedenko), Raymond Ayers (Constantine), Maxime Alvarez de Toledo (Sorin), Amy Shoremount-Obra (Nina), Amy Gough (Arkadina), Matthew Worth (Trigorin), Thomas Pertel (Shamrayeff), Sarah Kraus (Pauline), Alvaro Vallejo (Dr. Dorn); Manhattan School of Music Chorus and Orchestra, conductor David Gilbert. Albany Records TROY579-80

Notes and references

Sources
 Davis, Peter G., "An Opera That Flies", New York Magazine, 6 January 2006. Review of the Manhattan School of Music performance. Retrieved 5 October 2007.
 Dyers, Richard, "Reunion: Thomas Pasatieri", Opera News, April 2007, vol 71, no. 10. Retrieved 5 October 2007.
 Midgette, Anne, "Finding the Musical Romance in a Chekhov Play", The New York Times, 14 December 2002. Review of the Manhattan School of Music performance. Retrieved 5 October 2007.
 Thomas Pasatieri official website. Retrieved 5 October 2007.

1974 operas
Operas by Thomas Pasatieri
English-language operas
Operas
Opera world premieres at Houston Grand Opera
Operas based on plays
Operas set in Russia
Operas based on works by Anton Chekhov